Daniil Leonidovich Andreyev (November 2, 1906, Berlin – March 30, 1959, Moscow) was a Russian writer, poet, and Christian mystic.

Biography 
Daniil Andreyev, the son of Leonid Andreyev (a prominent Russian writer of the start of the 20th century), had Maxim Gorky as his godfather. After the infant's mother, Aleksandra Mikhailovna (Veligorskaya) Andreyeva (a great-niece of Taras Shevchenko), died shortly after childbirth, Leonid Andreyev gave the infant Daniil to his late wife's sister, Elizabeth Mikhailovna Dobrova, to raise. This act had two important consequences: it meant that when Leonid Andreyev, like many other writers and intellectuals, left Russia (he emigrated to  the newly independent Finland in December 1917 after the Bolshevik Revolution), his young son remained behind; it also meant that Daniil was raised in a household that remained deeply religious.

Like many of his contemporaries, the boy Daniil had a pronounced literary bent; he began writing poetry and prose in early childhood. He graduated from high school but could not attend university because of his "non-proletarian" background. Supporting himself as a graphic artist, he wrote in his spare time.

Daniil Andreyev was conscripted into the Red Army in 1942. He served as a non-combatant, and during the Siege of Leningrad of 1941-1944 helped to transport supplies across Lake Ladoga. After World War II Andreev returned to civilian life, but the Soviet authorities arrested him in April 1947, charged him with anti-Soviet propaganda and preparations to assassinate Joseph Stalin, and sentenced him to 25 years of imprisonment. He suffered a heart attack in prison in 1954, the first manifestation of the heart condition that would eventually cause his death. In the same year his sentence was reduced to 10 years. He was released on April 22, 1957, already terminally ill. He was officially rehabilitated on July 11, 1957.

While incarcerated in Vladimir Central Prison from 1947 to 1957, Andreyev experienced mystic visions and started writing Roza Mira, finishing it after his release. The book became known in the Soviet Union via samizdat, but was first officially published only in 1991. In 1997 Lindisfarne Books published Jordan Roberts's English-language translation of Roza Mira
in the USA. A second English translation of Rose of the World was done by Daniel H. Shubin in 2018.

Detailed biography

Childhood and adolescence 

Daniil Andreyev was the second son of the famous Russian writer Leonid Andreyev (a prominent Russian writer at the start of the 20th century) and Alexandra Mikhailovna Andreyeva, who was the great-niece of Taras Shevchenko. Daniil Andreyev's older brother was V.L. Andreyev. On November 2, 1906, Daniil Andreyev was born in Berlin's Grunewald at Herbertstrasse, 26.

A few days after the birth of Daniil, his mother died from a postpartum fever. The shocked father blamed the newborn son for the death of his beloved wife, and the grandmother Euphrosyne Varfolomeevna Veligorskaya (1846-1913) took the boy to Moscow, to the family of her other daughter, Elizaveta Mikhailovna Dobrova (1868-1942), the wife of the famous Moscow doctor Philip Alexandrovich Dobrov. At this time, the Dobrovs lived in Chulkov's house (No. 38), on the corner of Arbat and Spasopeskovsky Lane. Daniil was often sick and it was hard work for his adopted family to help him survive. Later the Dobrovs settled in Maly Levshinsky Lane (No. 5).

Andreyev's grandmother contracted diphtheria from ill Daniil and then died. That summer, at a dacha on the Black River near St. Petersburg, Daniil was stopped from drowning himself, yearning to see his mother and grandmother again.

Surrounded by care and attention, the boy was brought up in the family of his aunt as her own son. The Dobrov House was one of the literary and musical centers of Moscow at the time. Among guests in Daniil's home were famous people: I. A. Bunin, M. Gorky (Daniil's godfather), A. N. Scriabin, F. I. Chaliapin, actors of the Art Theater, etc. Under the influence of the atmosphere of the house, the boy began to write poems and prose early.

In the spring of 1915 he wrote his first poem, "The Garden". In the same year, his first stories were written: “The Journey of Insects” and “The Life of Antediluvian Animals” (not preserved). Also in childhood, according to the memoirs of his spouse A. A. Andreyeva, Daniil wrote a great epic, where the action takes place in a fictional interplanetary space. In his room, the boy drew portraits of the rulers of the dynasty he invented, portraits as tall as the boy.

In September 1917, Andreyev entered the Moscow Gymnasium of E. A. Repman (Nikitsky Boulevard d. 9/10), which he graduated in 1923. In 1924 he continued his studies at the Higher Literary and Art Institute of Bryusov (Higher State Literary Courses Mosprofobr). At the same time, he began to work on the novel Sinners. In 1926 he entered the Union of Poets (which existed until 1929).

At the age of 15, in August 1921, in one of the squares surrounding the Cathedral of Christ the Savior, a vision of the “Heavenly Kremlin” opened to young Daniil. He writes about it in the first chapter of the second part of the book Rose of the World.

At the end of August 1926, Andreyev married Alexander Lvovna Gubler (pseudonym Gorobova; 1907–1985), who studied with him at the Higher State Literary Courses. The wedding took place in the temple of the Resurrection of the Word. The marriage did not last long, and disintegrated by the end of the second month. In February 1927, the couple officially divorced, and Andreyev left the Higher State Literary Courses.

He experienced the second event of a mystical nature on Easter 1928 in the Church of the Intercession in Levshin. It was a powerful insight into the world history of the planet as a singular mystical stream, which he writes about in the second chapter of the first part of the Rose of the World: "Through the exultant movements and sounds of the service being performed in front of me, I was able to perceive that higher region, that heavenly land in which our entire planet appears as the Great Church and where an eternal liturgy is celebrated without ceasing by enlightened humankind in a splendor beyond our imagination."

In 1928, the poem “Red Moscow” was written (not preserved), he continued working on the novel Sinners (not preserved), and he began the cycle “The Catacombs”. Daniil spent the summer of 1928 in Tarusa.

In the 1930s, Andreyev worked as a type designer, wrote advertisements and inscriptions, devoting most of his time and strength to literary activity. In 1930, he began work on the poem "Solstice" (not preserved).

Prewar years. War 

1930-1932 - Andreev spends three years every summer in the Bryansk region. His many-day wandering through the forest led to a spiritual and mystical experience associated with the elementals (spirits of nature). July 29, 1931, on the banks of the Nerussa Andreev is experiencing what he called the breakthrough of cosmic consciousness.

In the summer of 1931, Andreev met with M.A. Voloshin.

From February to March 1932, Andreev works first as a literary editor, and then deputy director of the newspaper at the Moscow Dinamo plant, a job which he quits voluntarily. In this time he gets another powerful mystical experience, this time almost wholly negative: "In February of 1932, during my brief employment at a Moscow factory, I fell ill, and one night, while feverish, I was the recipient of a revelation that the majority of people will, of course, consider nothing more than delirium. But for me, it was horrifying in content and unquestionably authentic. As in my previous books, I will use the expression «the Third Witzraor» to refer to the creature that the revelation concerned. I did not think up that strange, foreign-sounding name by myself. It came to me at the time. Simplified, I would define that gigantic creature, which somewhat resembles the monsters of ocean depths, yet far surpasses them in size, as a demon of state power. That night was to remain for a long time afterward one of the most painful experiences I've had ever known. I think the term "infraphysical breach of the psyche" would be quite applicable to that experience."
 
In the summer of the same year, he finished the collection of poems "Poet's Diary" (destroyed by the author not later than 1933). In 1933, Andreev began to work on the essay Outlines of the "Outlines of the Preliminary Doctrine", which remained incomplete, and on the cycle of "Foothills". On October 20, 1934, he attends Koktebel, writes a poem "The grave of M. Voloshin."

In year 1933 Andreev has the most powerful mystical experience so far: "In November of 1933, I chanced to stop by a small church on Vlasevsky Lane. There, an acathistus to St. Serafim of Sarov was in progress. Hardly had I opened the door when a warm wave of choral music descended on me and surged straight to my heart. I was overcome by a state that is very difficult for me to write about, let alone describe without tears. Although I had previously disdained to engage in genuflection-my emotional immaturity has led me to suspect something servile in the custom-an irresistible impulse caused me to kneel. But even that was not enough. And when I prostrated myself on the rug, which was faded and worn by thousands of feet, some secret door in my soul swung open, and tears of blissful rapture, comparable to nothing else I had ever known, gushed forth uncontrollably. In truth, I do not really care how experts of various kinds of ecstasies label what then followed, and into what categories they place it. During those minutes I was raised to Heavenly Russia and presented before its Synclite of the enlightened. I felt the unearthly warmth of spiritual rays pouring from the center of the land, which is accurately and fittingly called the Heavenly Kremlin. The great spirit who had at one time lived on Earth in the person of Serafim of Sarov, and who is now one of the brightest lights on the Russian Synclite, approached and bent down to me, wrapping me, as if with a vestment, in streaming rays of light and gentle warmth. For almost a whole year, until the church was closed down, I went every Monday to the acathistus of St. Serafim and, incredibly, experienced that same state every time, again and again, with undiminished strength."

In 1935, Andreev entered the Moscow City Committee of graphic artists. On September 8, “The first song” of the poem “A Song of Monsalvat” appeared (the poem was completed in 1938). In 1937, on the advice of E. P. Peshkova, wrote a letter to Stalin with a request to facilitate the return of his brother V. L. Andreev from emigration. In the autumn of 1937, Andreev began work on a novel about the spiritual quest of the intelligentsia in those years, called "The Wanderers of the Night". It was conceived as an “epic of the spirit” and a portrait of the era; interrupted by the war, the work was almost completed later in 1947.

In early March 1937, Andreev met Alla Alexandrovna Ivasheva-Musatova (1915–2005), who after 8 years became his wife. Condemned with her husband and released a year earlier, A.A. Andreeva became support for Andreev in the last years of her imprisonment and in the difficult years after. Having preserved the legacy of her husband, A.A. Andreeva made possible the publication of his main works at the end of the 20th century, including the "Rose of the World". Later, she was for 15 years the wife of the son of the writer I. A. Belousov, Yevgeny (1907-1977).

At the end of April 1941, F. A. Dobrov dies, whom Andreev considered his adoptive father. During the Great Patriotic War, Andreev worked on the poems "Ambers" (1942) and The Germans (not completed), completing the cycle of poems Catacombs (1928–1941). In July 1942, E. M. Dobrova died.

In October 1942, Andreev was drafted into the army. Andreev was part of the 196th Red Banner Rifle Division when it entered the besieged Leningrad over the ice of Lake Ladoga in January 1943. He was part of the funeral team, acted as a paramedic and army graphic designer. He received the medal "For the Defense of Leningrad". On June 25, 1945, Andreev was officially recognized as a disabled veteran of World War II of the 2nd group with a pension of 300 rubles.

After the war, Andreev returned to Moscow to work as a graphic designer at the Moscow Museum of Communications.
On November 4, 1945, Andreev's marriage with A. A. Ivasheva-Musatova was registered.

Arrest. Prison years 

In early 1947, Andreev was working on completing the novel The Wanderers of the Night (two chapters remained unwritten); mulls over the second novel of the supposed trilogy “The Heavenly Kremlin”, in which the author's front-line experience was to be embodied.

On April 21, 1947, Andreeva was arrested under the 58th article, the reason for which was the denunciation and the novel The Strangers of the Night. On April 23, A. A. Andreeva is arrested. Andreev was charged with the creation of an anti-Soviet group with agitation and terrorist intentions. Andreev received by the verdict of the Special Meeting of NKVD, it received 25 years in prison - the harshest penalty in the USSR at that time. (under Articles 19-58-8, 58-10, part 2, 58 -11 of the Criminal Code of the RSFSR.

Together with him, 19 relatives and close friends were sentenced to imprisonment for a term of 10 to 25 years in forced labor camps. Everything is written by Andreev before his arrest is destroyed by the NKVD.

On November 27 in 1948, Andreev was escorted from the Lefortovo MBG prison to Vladimir prison number 2 ("Vladimir Central"). He would be imprisoned until 1957. He created works while imprisoned despite not being allowed to do it by prison authorities. As he later wrote in his "Rose of the World" book: "I began writing it in a prison designated as a «political isolation ward.» I wrote it in secret. I hid the manuscript, and the forces of good-humans and otherwise-concealed it for me during searches. Yet every day I expected the manuscript to be confiscated and destroyed, just as my previous work-work to which I had given ten years of my life and for which I had been consigned to the political isolation ward-had been destroyed."

Therein "Vladimir Central", Andreev has another mystical vision, which, combined with later experience, becomes foundation of knowledge, upon which he could later write his most famous work "Rose of the World": "Lastly, something similar, but completely devoid of metahistorical terror, happened to me one night in September of 1949 in a small prison cell in Vladimir, while my lone cellmate was sleeping. The experience reoccurred several times between 1950 and 1953, again at night, and in a communal cell. The experience I had acquired on the previously described path, of knowledge was insufficient to write The Rose of the World. But movement along that path brought me to the point where I was able from time to time to interact consciously with certain members of the Providential forces, and the hours of those spiritual meetings became a source of more precise metahistorical knowledge than the path I have just described."

In 1950, Andreev completed work on the poem "Nemerech" (1937-1950), starts the poetic book "Russian Octave". In December 1950, the poem “Symphony of city day” was created. On December 23 Andreev begins work on the "Iron Mystery", on December 24 - on the "Rose of the World."

In 1951, Andreev worked on the "Morning Oratorio", in February he created the poem "The Death of the Ivan the Terrible". In 1952 he began work on the first version of the book "Russian Gods" (completed in 1953), creates the poem "Ruch".

In 1953, still in prison, Andreev completed work on novels for the book “The Newest Plutarch. Illustrated biographical dictionary of imaginary famous figures of all countries and times from A to Z ”, written by him together with his neighbors in the “academic” prison chamber, historian L. L. Rakov and physiologist V. V. Parin. The poem "The Leningrad Apocalypse" is finished.

5 March 1953 Stalin dies, which could be considered an event that made it possible for Andreev to get out of imprisonment later.

In October–November 1953, before being transferred to another cell, Andreev experienced mystical experiences, which he would later call unprecedented in its grandeur.

On November 10, 1954, Andreev wrote a statement addressed to the Chairman of the Council of Ministers of the USSR, G. M. Malenkov: "Without yet being convinced of the existence in our country of genuine, guaranteed democratic freedoms, I still cannot accept the position of full and unconditional acceptance of the Soviet system." At the end of 1954, Andreev suffered a myocardial infarction. In 1955, he worked on the poems "Navna" and "Among the demons of retribution". On February 8, 1956, Andrew's cousin A.F. Kovalenskaya died in the camp hospital. On May 2, 1956, work on "the Iron Mystery" (1950-1956) is completed. On August 10, Andreev's wife Alla is released from the labor camp.

On August 23, 1956, the Commission of the Presidium of the Supreme Soviet of the USSR issued a resolution: “To consider conviction unfounded under articles of Criminal Code 19-58-8, 58-11, to reduce the sentence to 10 years in prison under Article 58-10, Part 2”. On August 24, for the first time since his arrest, Andreev was allowed to meet with his wife in prison. At the meeting, he was able to give her some of his writings. On November 17, by the decision of the USSR Supreme Court, the resolution of the CCA dated October 30, 1948, was canceled, and the case of D. L. Andreev was sent for further investigation.

On April 23, 1957, Andreev was released from custody (Information No. 435 of April 23, 1957). June 21 The Plenum of the Supreme Court of the USSR reviews the case of D. L. Andreev and cancels the charges against him. July 11, 1957, Andreev rehabilitated.

The last years of life 

In the summer of 1957, in the village of Kopanovo, Ryazan Region, D. Andreev is seriously ill with pneumonia. In this time, after 40 years of separation, he meets with his elder brother Vadim. In November 1957, Andreev and his wife settled in Moscow in a room at Ashcheulov lane, 14/1, ap. 4. On November 22, Andreev again receives the status of a disabled of the second group and he is awarded a pension of 347 rubles. On November 30, Andreyev's cousin A. F. Dobrov dies in the House of Invalids in Potma. In late 1957, Andreev together with Z. Rahim was working on the translation of three short stories of Japanese writer Fumiko Hayashi from the book "Six stories."

On February 12, 1958, Andreev wrote a letter to the Central Committee of the CPSU, in which he asked to consider accompanied poetic works for publication: “To live without talking to people and hiding your work literally from everyone is not only difficult but unbearable,” after which on February 26 he is summoned to the Central Committee of CPSU. The conversation there gave him hope that his work could be published in the future. He also soon receives some material assistance through the Union of Writers.

In the spring of 1958, after exacerbation of angina and atherosclerosis, Andreev was taken to the hospital of the Institute of Therapy of the USSR Academy of Medical Sciences. On June 4, Archpriest Nikolai Golubtsov holds the wedding of Daniil and Alla Andreev in the Rizopolozhensky church on Donskoy, after which they set off on a journey on the steamer "Pomyalovsky" on the route "Moscow  - Ufa  - Moscow". On July 5, 1958, Andreev finishes the eleventh book of "The Rose of the World", and on October 12, the entire treatise.

In October 1958, the work on the cycle of poems “The Tale of Yarosvet” and the prose poem “The Reverse of the World” is completed. On the night of October 19, Andreev wrote his last poem “Sometime earlier in the prime of life ...” in which he prayed for the salvation of his manuscripts. At the beginning of November a cycle of poems “Svyatorussky spirits” is compiled. November 14, immediately after returning from Goryachy Klyuch to Moscow, Andreev is placed in the hospital of the Institute of Therapy of the USSR Academy of Medical Sciences.

On January 23, 1959, A.A. Andreeva received a warrant for a room in a two-room communal apartment at Leninsky prospect, d.82 / 2, ap.165, in which 
Andreev will live the last forty days of his life, constantly tormented by heart attacks. Daniil Andreev died on March 30, 1959. On April 3, a funeral was held in Andreev in the Temple of the Deposition of the Rocks on Donskoy, archpriest Nikolai Golubtsov was serving at the funeral. His body was buried on the Novodevichy cemetery near the mother's grave.

No literary artwork by Andreev was published during his lifetime, with a single exception of the book “Wonderful Researchers of Mountainous Central Asia”), which was created in collaboration with S. N. Matveyev and published in 1946.

Works 
Almost all works that Andreev wrote before 1947, were destroyed by Ministry for State Security (MGB) as "anti-Soviet literature", including his novel Wanderers of Night about the spiritual opposition to the Soviet regime and atheism.  Being imprisoned, however, Andreev managed to restore some of his poems.  He also tried to restore Wanderers of Night, but he could only restore a few pages of it.  Also some works of his childhood were kept by his friend, including his first poems written at the age of 8.

His main book, Roza Mira (literally "The Rose of the World") contains a detailed description of numerous layers of spiritual reality that surround Earth, of the forthcoming religion called Roza Mira that will emerge and unite all people and states, and of the events of the future advent of Antichrist and his fall.

Apart from Roza Mira, he wrote a poem The Iron Mystery (published in 1990), a "poetic ensemble" (that is what he called it) Russian gods (full text published in 1995) and other works.

References

External links
The Rose of the World by Daniel Andreev
RozaMira.org – in Russian
Site devoted to Roza Mira, including full text – in Russian
Vseedinstvo and Roza Mira – in Russian
Fund of a name of Daniel Andreev – in Russian
Rose of the World – A translation of the first half of the "Rose of the World" from the Russian into English by Jordan Roberts 
Daniel and Alla Andreev – a biography by Daniel H. Shubin 
Rose of the World – A translation of "Rose of the World" from the Russian into English by Daniel H Shubin  

1906 births
1959 deaths
Writers from Moscow
Burials at Novodevichy Cemetery
20th-century Christian mystics
Prison writings
Russian male poets
Russian male novelists
Russian people of World War II
Russian prisoners and detainees
Soviet military personnel of World War II
Soviet poets
Soviet novelists
Soviet male writers
20th-century Russian male writers
20th-century Russian poets
Soviet prisoners and detainees
Stalinism-era scholars and writers
Soviet rehabilitations
20th-century Russian historians
Inmates of Vladimir Central Prison
Demonologists